The TAB Classic, registered as the Robert Sangster Stakes, is a South Australian Jockey Club Group 1 Thoroughbred Weight for Age horse race for fillies and mares two (2) years old and upwards, over a distance of 1200 metres at the Morphettville Racecourse Adelaide, Australia in the Autumn Carnival. Prize money is A$502,250

History
The race was held in February prior to 2006. After rescheduling of the Adelaide Cup Carnival the SAJC moved the race to the autumn.

In 2005 the race was renamed the Robert Sangster Stakes after prolific owner and breeder Robert Sangster who died in 2004.

Robert Sangster was the principal of Swettenham Stud and the renaming recognises his contribution to the Australian thoroughbred industry.

Name

1983–2004 - Swettenham Stud Stakes
2005–2009 - Robert Sangster Stakes
2010–2014 - Sportingbet Classic
2015 - William Hill Classic
2016–2018 - Ubet Classic
2019 onwards - TAB Classic

Grade
 1983 - Special Race
1984–1985 - Listed Race
1986–2003 - Group 3
 2004 - Group 2
2005 onwards - Group 1

Venue

The race was run in 2002 at Cheltenham Park over a 
distance of 1250 metres.

Records

The race record time for running of the 1200 metres is held by Umaline in a time of 1:08.14 in 2001.

Most wins by a trainer - 3 times: 
Lee Freedman - 2005–07
Mick Price - 1998, 2004, 2009

Winners

 2022 - Snapdancer
 2021 - Instant Celebrity
 2020 - Bella Vella
 2019 - Spright
 2018 - Shoals
 2017 - Secret Agenda
 2016 - Precious Gem
 2015 - Miracles Of Life
 2014 - Driefontein
 2013 - Platelet
 2012 - Black Caviar
 2011 - Response
 2010 - Rostova
 2009 - Bel Mer
 2008 - Juste Momente
 2007 - Universal Queen
 2006 - Ellicorsam
 2005 - Alinghi
 2004 - French Bid
 2003 - Our Egyptian Raine
 2002 - Suzy Grey
 2001 - Umaline
 2000 - Rain Dance Lady
 1999 - Dantelah
 1998 - Spirit Of Love
 1997 - Apple Danish
 1996 - Mad Shavril
 1995 - Viminaria
 1994 - Tarare
 1993 - True Spirit
 1992 - Western Chorus
 1991 - With Me
 1990 - Leica Western
 1989 - Tree Of Renown
 1988 - Even True
 1987 - Wicked Smile
 1986 - Lost Art
 1985 - Showport
 1984 - Vatican Lass
 1983 - Ranee’s Palace

See also
 List of Australian Group races
 Group races

References

Group 1 stakes races in Australia
Sprint category horse races for fillies and mares
Sport in Adelaide